Javassist (Java programming assistant) is a Java library providing a means to manipulate the Java bytecode of an application. In this sense Javassist provides the support for structural reflection, i.e. the ability to change the implementation of a class at run time.

Bytecode manipulation is performed at load-time through a provided class loader.

Javassist enables Java programs to define a new class at runtime and to modify a class file when the JVM loads it. Unlike other similar bytecode editors, Javassist provides two levels of API: source level and bytecode level. Using the source-level API, programmers can edit a class file without knowledge of the specifications of the Java bytecode; the whole API is designed with only the vocabulary of the Java language. Programmers can even specify inserted bytecode in the form of Java source text; Javassist compiles it on the fly. On the other hand, the bytecode-level API allows the users to directly edit a class file as other editors.

Uses
Javassist can be used for the following:
 For specifying the bytecode using source code – can compile a fragment of source text online (e.g., just a single statement)
 For aspect-oriented programming (AOP) – can introduce new methods into a class and insert before/after/around advice at both the caller and callee sides
 For reflection at runtime – can use a metaobject that controls method calls on base-level objects
 For remote method invocation – can call a method on a remote object running on a web server, an alternative to Java RMI that does not need a stub compiler such as

See also
 
ObjectWeb ASM
Byte Code Engineering Library

References

External links

Java (programming language) libraries